Tre gringos (Three gringo's) is a song originally recorded by Just D on 1995 album "Plast". Originally, the song had a doo-wop arrangement.

During the Grammis Awards ceremony in 1996 gala, Just D performed the song together with Thorleifs. The song was now turned into a dansband song with a saxophone arrangement. This version was also released as a single, topping the Swedish singles chart. The song also stayed at Svensktoppen for totally 13 weeks between 16 March-8 June 1996, peaking at second position.

The Just D and Thorleifs recording charted at Trackslistan for 9 weeks between 9 March-4 May 1996.

Lyrical the song describes a group of people noticing an advertising for a saxophone, and travel with the Stockholm metro blueline from Fridhemsplan out to a suburb to buy it. Once there, they encounter a cultural life originating at warmer places. and the song lyrics describe modern life changing world, making people feel like it's "shrinking".

At Dansbandskampen 2008, the song was performed by Nizeguys.

References

1995 songs
Thorleifs songs
Songs about Stockholm
Songs about music
Songs about trains
Swedish hip hop songs
Swedish-language songs